The economy of The Bahamas is dependent upon tourism and offshore banking. The Bahamas is the richest country in the Caribbean and is ranked 14th in North America for nominal GDP. It is a stable, developing nation in the Lucayan Archipelago, with a population of 391,232 (2016). Steady growth in tourism receipts and a boom in construction of new hotels, resorts, and residences had led to solid GDP growth for many years. The slowdown in the Economy of the United States and the September 11 attacks held back growth in these sectors from 2001 to 2003.

Financial services constitute the second-most important sector of the Bahamian economy, accounting for about 15% of GDP. However, since December 2000, when the government enacted new regulations on the financial sector, many international businesses have left the Bahamas. Manufacturing and agriculture together contribute approximately 10% of GDP and show little growth, despite government incentives for those sectors. Overall growth prospects in the short run rest heavily on the fortunes of the tourism sector, which depends on growth in the United States, the source of more than 80% of the visitors. In addition to tourism and banking, the government supports the development of a "2nd-pillar", e-commerce.

Features of the Bahamian economy
The Bahamian economy is almost entirely dependent on tourism and financial services to generate foreign exchange earnings. The Gross Domestic Product (GDP) of The Bahamas is approximately $5.7 billion with tourism accounting for 80%, financial services nearly 20% and the balance spread among retail and wholesale trade, fishing, light manufacturing and agriculture. The European Union lists the Bahamas as one of several Caribbean "uncooperative jurisdictions" because it fails to meet tax fairness and transparency benchmarks.

Tourism
Tourism alone provides an estimated 51% of the gross domestic product (GDP) and employs about half the Bahamian workforce. In 2016, over 3 million tourists visited the Bahamas, most of whom are from the United States and Canada.

A major contribution to the recent growth in the overall Bahamian economy is Kerzner International's Atlantis Resort and Casino, which took over the former Paradise Island Resort and has provided a much needed boost to the economy. In addition, the opening of Breezes Super Club and Sandals Resort also aided this turnaround. The Bahamian Government also has adopted a proactive approach to courting foreign investors and has conducted major investment missions to the Far East, Europe, Latin America, and Canada. The primary purpose of the trips was to restore the reputation of the Bahamas in these markets.

Offshore financial services

Financial services constitute the second-most important sector of the Bahamian economy, accounting for up to 17% of GDP, due to the country's status as an offshore financial center. As of December 1998, 418 banks and trust companies have been licensed in the Bahamas. The Bahamas promulgated the International Business Companies (IBC) Act in January 1990 to enhance the country's status as a leading financial center. The Act simplified and reduced the cost of incorporating offshore companies in the Bahamas. Within 9 years, more than 100,000 IBC-type companies had been established. In February 1991, the government also legalized the establishment of Asset Protection Trusts in the Bahamas. In December 2000, partly as a response to appearing the plenary FATF Blacklist, the government enacted a legislative package to better regulate the financial sector, including creation of a Financial Intelligence Unit and enforcement of "know-your-customer" rules. Other initiatives include the enactment of the Foundations Act in 2004 and the planned introduction of legislation to regulate Private Trust Companies. After being later off the blacklist, in December 2020 Bahamas also was taken off the FATF greylist.

Agriculture

Agriculture and fisheries industry together account for 5% of GDP. The Bahamas exports lobster and some fish but does not raise these items commercially. There is no large scale agriculture, and most agricultural products are consumed domestically. The Bahamas imports more than $250 million in foodstuffs per year, representing about 80% of its food consumption. The government aims to expand food production to reduce imports and generate foreign exchange. It actively seeks foreign investment aimed at increasing agricultural exports, particularly specialty food items. The government officially lists beef and pork production and processing, fruits and nuts, dairy production, winter vegetables, and mariculture (shrimp farming) as the areas in which it wishes to encourage foreign investment.

Trade 

The Bahamian Government maintains the value of the Bahamian dollar on a par with the U.S. dollar. The Bahamas is a beneficiary of the U.S.-Caribbean Basin Trade Partnership Act (CBTPA), Canada's CARIBCAN program, and the European Union's Lome IV Agreement. Although the Bahamas participates in the political aspects of the Caribbean Community (CARICOM), it has not entered into joint economic initiatives with other Caribbean states.

Industry
The Bahamas has a few notable industrial firms: the Freeport pharmaceutical firm, PharmaChem Technologies (GrandBahama) Ltd. (formerly Syntex); the BORCO oil facility, also in Freeport, which transships oil in the region; the Commonwealth Brewery in Nassau, which produces Heineken, Guinness, and Kalik beers; and Bacardi Corp., which distills rum in Nassau for shipment to the U.S. and European markets. Other industries include sun-dried sea salt in Great Inagua, a wet dock facility in Freeport for repair of cruise ships, and mining of aragonite—a type of limestone with several industrial uses—from the sea floor at Ocean Cay. Other smaller but more nimble players in the banking industry include Fidelity Bank (Bahamas) Ltd. (FBB) and Royal Fidelity Merchant Bank & Trust Limited (RFMBT). FBB offers a wide range of innovative banking products including loan products with built-in savings plans. RFMBT is the only merchant bank in the Bahamas and is a joint venture with Royal Bank of Canada. It provides investment products and services and attracts the majority of the corporate business deals in the Bahamas, most recently acting as financial advisor and placement agent for the largest initial public offering (IPO) ever in the Bahamas with the IPO of Commonwealth Brewery, a Heineken subsidiary.

The Hawksbill Creek Agreement established a duty-free zone in Freeport, the Bahamas' second-largest city, with a nearby industrial park to encourage foreign industrial investment. The Hong Kong-based firm, Hutchison Whampoa, has opened a container port in Freeport. The Bahamian Parliament approved legislation in 1993 that extended most Freeport tax and duty exemptions through 2054.

Taxation

The Bahamas has no income tax, corporate tax, capital gains tax, or wealth tax. Payroll taxes fund social insurance benefits and amount to 3.9% paid by the employee and 5.9% paid by the employer. In 2010, overall tax revenue was 17.2% of GDP. A value-added tax (VAT) of 7.5% has been levied 1 January 2015. It then increased from 7.5% to 12% effective from 1 July 2018.

Statistics
The following table shows the main economic indicators in 1980–2017.

 Household income or consumption by percentage share—highest 10%: 27% (2000)
 Agriculture - products—citrus, vegetables, poultry
 Electricity - production—2,505 GWh (2007 est.) - Rank 133
 Electricity - consumption—1,793 GWh (2007) - Rank 133
 Oil - consumption— (2006 est.) - Rank 115
 Exchange rate—Bahamian dollar is pegged to the U.S. dollar on a one-to-one basis

The Bahamas has the 47th freest economy in the world according to The Heritage Foundation 2010 Index of Economic Freedom. The Bahamas is ranked 7th out of 29 countries in the South and Central America/Caribbean region, and its overall score is higher than the regional and world averages. Total government spending, including consumption and transfer payments, is relatively low. In the most recent year, government spending was 23.4% of GDP.

See also 
 List of Commonwealth of Nations countries by GDP
 List of Latin American and Caribbean countries by GDP growth
 List of Latin American and Caribbean countries by GDP (nominal)
 List of Latin American and Caribbean countries by GDP (PPP)

References

External links 
 Bahamian Government Statistics